Ditropichthys storeri is a species of flabby whalefish found in the deep oceans at depths of from .  This species grows to a length of  SL.

References
 

Cetomimidae
Monotypic fish genera
Fish described in 1895